Urge is an album by American trumpeter Ted Curson which was recorded in the Netherlands and first released on the Dutch Fontana label in 1966.

Track listing
All compositions by Ted Curson except as indicated
 "Roy's Boys" - 14:20
 "You Don't Know What Love Is" (Don Raye, Gene de Paul) - 6:11
 "Cinq Quartre" - 7:45
 "Musis Sacrum" - 8:16
 "The Leopard" - 8:01
 "Latino" - 10:35

Personnel
Ted Curson - trumpet, pocket trumpet
Booker Ervin - tenor saxophone
Jimmy Woode  - bass
Edgar Bateman - drums

References

1966 albums
Fontana Records albums
Ted Curson albums